Morrisburg is an unincorporated community in the Municipality of South Dundas, located in Eastern Ontario, Canada.

History

On November 11, 1813, a small British force repelled an invading American army at the Battle of Crysler's Farm, which took place near what was later to be called Morrisburg.
United Empire Loyalist settlers settled in Dundas County, creating West Williamsburg and was part of the Williamsburg Canal project. Between 1843 and 1856, canals were built on the north side of the St. Lawrence River. West Williamsburg was renamed Morrisburg in 1851 in honour of Brockville, Ontario, politician James Morris, who was named the first Postmaster General of the United Province of Canada.
Incorporated as a village in 1860, Morrisburg had a growing manufacturing base consisting of a gristmill, a carding mill and a fanning mill. The Grand Trunk Railway reached Morrisburg in 1855. Eventually a power station was built on the St. Lawrence River.

During the 1950s, portions of Morrisburg were relocated because of expected flooding caused by the St. Lawrence Seaway project. Over 80 homes were moved and the entire downtown business district was demolished and relocated to a shopping plaza. The Canadian National Railway line was moved 1.1 kilometers north of its original location. Much of the former railbed was used in the reconstruction of Ontario Highway 2.  Buildings and other artifacts were moved and assembled to create Upper Canada Village, a tribute to the area's pioneers.

A notable incident in the history of high-speed rail in Canada took place near Morrisburg in 1979, when a UAC TurboTrain operated by Via Rail on westbound service from Montréal to Toronto caught fire after developing an oil leak. The train was quickly evacuated and ultimately a third of it was destroyed in the fire. The troubled Turbo Trains were retired a few years later, in 1982.

In 1997, Morrisburg was amalgamated with the Village of Iroquois, along with Matilda and Williamsburg Townships, into the Township of South Dundas.

References

Further reading 
"Lake Ontario and Upper St. Lawrence", The Canadian Oxford School Atlas, Oxford University Press, second edition, 1963, p. 21.
"Ontario", The New World Atlas and Gazetteer, P. F. Collier &Son, New York, 1924, p. 74.
Morrisburg information - Government of Canada
History of Morrisburg
 Malcomson, Robert. Historical Dictionary of the War of 1812. Scarecrow Press, January 16, 2006.
"November 11 bicentennial service at Crysler Memorial" Morrisburg Leader, November 6, 2013.
"History comes alive on the web". Cornwall Standard Freeholder, June 20, 2012.
"St. Lawrence Seaway: Let the flooding begin". CBC Digital Archives.

External links 

Former villages in Ontario
Communities in the United Counties of Stormont, Dundas and Glengarry
Ontario populated places on the Saint Lawrence River